The 1994 Nevada Wolf Pack football team represented the University of Nevada, Reno during the 1994 NCAA Division I-A football season. Nevada competed as a member of the Big West Conference (BWC). The Wolf Pack were led by Chris Ault in his 18th overall and 1st straight season since taking over as head coach for the second time. They played their home games at Mackay Stadium.

Schedule

References

Nevada
Nevada Wolf Pack football seasons
Big West Conference football champion seasons
Nevada Wolf Pack football